Potassium bitartrate, also known as potassium hydrogen tartrate, with formula KC4H5O6, is a byproduct of winemaking. In cooking, it is known as cream of tartar. It is processed from the potassium acid salt of tartaric acid (a carboxylic acid). The resulting powder can be used in baking or as a cleaning solution (when mixed with an acidic solution such as lemon juice or white vinegar).

History 
Potassium bitartrate was first characterized by Swedish chemist Carl Wilhelm Scheele (1742-1786). This was a result of Scheele's work studying fluorite and hydrofluoric acid.

Scheele may have been the first scientist to publish work on potassium bitartrate, but use of potassium bitartrate has been reported to date back 7000 years to an ancient village in northern Iran. Modern applications of cream of tartar started in 1768 after it gained popularity when the French started using it regularly in their cuisine.

Occurrence

Potassium bitartrate is naturally formed in grapes from the acid dissociation of tartaric acid into bitartrate and tartrate ions.

Potassium bitartrate has a low solubility in water. It crystallizes in wine casks during the fermentation of grape juice, and can precipitate out of wine in bottles. The rate of potassium bitartrate precipitation depends on the rates of nuclei formation and crystal growth, which varies based on a wine's alcohol, sugar, and extract content. The crystals (wine diamonds) will often form on the underside of a cork in wine-filled bottles that have been stored at temperatures below , and will seldom, if ever, dissolve naturally into the wine. Over time, crystal formation is less likely to occur due to the decreasing supersaturation of potassium bitartrate, with the greatest amount of precipitation occurring in the initial few days of cooling.

Historically, it was known as beeswing for its resemblance to the sheen of bees' wings. It was collected and purified to produce the white, odorless, acidic powder used for many culinary and other household purposes.

These crystals also precipitate out of fresh grape juice that has been chilled or allowed to stand for some time. To prevent crystals from forming in homemade grape jam or jelly, the prerequisite fresh grape juice should be chilled overnight to promote crystallization. The potassium bitartrate crystals are removed by filtering through two layers of cheesecloth. The filtered juice may then be made into jam or jelly. In some cases they adhere to the side of the chilled container, making filtering unnecessary.

The presence of crystals is less prevalent in red wines than in white wines. This is because red wines have a higher amount of tannin and colouring matter present as well as a higher sugar and extract content than white wines. Various methods such as promoting crystallization and filtering, removing the active species required for potassium bitartrate precipitation, and adding additives have been implemented to reduce the presence of potassium bitartrate crystals in wine.

Applications

In food

In food, potassium bitartrate is used for:
 Stabilizing egg whites, increasing their warmth-tolerance and volume
 Stabilizing whipped cream, maintaining its texture and volume
 Anti-caking and thickening
 Preventing sugar syrups from crystallizing by causing some of the sucrose to break down into glucose and fructose
 Reducing discoloration of boiled vegetables

Additionally, it is used as a component of:
 Baking powder, as an acid ingredient to activate baking soda
 Sodium-free salt substitutes, in combination with potassium chloride

A similar acid salt, sodium acid pyrophosphate, can be confused with cream of tartar because of its common function as a component of baking powder.

Baking 
Adding cream of tartar to egg whites gives volume to cakes, and makes them more tender. As cream of tartar is added, the pH decreases to around the isoelectric point of the foaming proteins in egg whites. Foaming properties of egg whites are optimal at this pH due to increased protein-protein interactions. The low pH also results in a whiter crumb in cakes due to flour pigments that respond to these pH changes. However, adding too much cream of tartar (>2.4% weight of egg white) can affect the texture and taste of cakes. The optimal cream of tartar concentration to increase volume and the whiteness of interior crumbs without making the cake too tender, is about 1/4 tsp per egg white.

As an acid, cream of tartar with heat reduces sugar crystallization in invert syrups by helping to break down sucrose into its monomer components - fructose and glucose in equal parts. Preventing the formation of sugar crystals makes the syrup have a non-grainy texture, shinier and less prone to break and dry. However, a downside of relying on cream of tartar to thin out crystalline sugar confections (like fudge) is that it can be hard to add the right amount of acid to get the desired consistency.

Cream of tartar is used as a type of acid salt that is crucial in baking powder. Upon dissolving in batter or dough, the tartaric acid that is released reacts with baking soda to form carbon dioxide that is used for leavening. Since cream of tartar is fast-acting, it releases over 70 percent of carbon dioxide gas during mixing.

Household use 
Potassium bitartrate can be mixed with an acidic liquid such as lemon juice or white vinegar to make a paste-like cleaning agent for metals such as brass, aluminium, or copper, or with water for other cleaning applications such as removing light stains from porcelain.
This mixture is sometimes mistakenly made with vinegar and sodium bicarbonate (baking soda), which actually react to neutralize each other, creating carbon dioxide and a sodium acetate solution.

Cream of tartar was often used in traditional dyeing where the complexing action of the tartrate ions was used to adjust the solubility and hydrolysis of mordant salts such as tin chloride and alum.

Cream of tartar, when mixed into a paste with hydrogen peroxide, can be used to clean rust from some hand tools, notably hand files.  The paste is applied and allowed to set for a few hours and then washed off with a baking soda/water solution. After another rinse with water and thorough drying, a thin application of oil will protect the file from further rusting.

Slowing the set time of plaster of Paris products (most widely used in gypsum plaster wall work and artwork casting) is typically achieved by the simple introduction of almost any acid diluted into the mixing water. A commercial retardant premix additive sold by USG to trade interior plasterers includes at least 40% potassium bitartrate. The remaining ingredients are the same plaster of Paris and quartz-silica aggregate already prominent in the main product. This means that the only active ingredient is the cream of tartar.

Cosmetics
For dyeing hair, potassium bitartrate can be mixed with henna as the mild acid needed to activate the henna.

Medicinal use
Cream of tartar has been used internally as a purgative, but this is dangerous because an excess of potassium, or hyperkalemia, may occur.

Chemistry
Potassium bitartrate is the United States' National Institute of Standards and Technology's primary reference standard for a pH buffer. Upon dissolution in water, potassium bitartrate will dissociate into acid tartrate, tartrate, and potassium ions. Thus, a saturated solution creates a buffer with standard pH.

Potassium carbonate can be made by burning cream of tartar, which produces "pearl ash". This process is now obsolete but produced a higher quality (reasonable purity) than "potash" extracted from wood or other plant ashes.

Production

See also
 Tartrate
 Tartaric acid
 Potassium tartrate (K2C4H4O6)

References

External links
 Description of Potassium Bitartrate at Monash Scientific
 Material Safety Data Sheet (MSDS) for Potassium Bitartrate at Fisher Scientific

Acid salts
Potassium compounds
Tartrates
Leavening agents
Edible thickening agents